"I Can't Get You Outa My Mind" is a song by Yvonne Elliman, released as the third single from her 1976 album Love Me.

It became an adult contemporary hit in the United States (#19) and Canada (#11). It also reached #17 on the UK Singles Chart.

"I Can't Get You Outa My Mind" was featured in a two-part 1979 episode of Hawaii Five-O in which Elliman also had a guest role as a Hawaiian singer.

Chart history

References

External links
 Lyrics of this song
 

1976 songs
1977 singles
Yvonne Elliman songs
Song recordings produced by Freddie Perren
RSO Records singles
Torch songs